Murray Commonwealth Marine Reserve is a 25,803 km2 marine protected area within Australian waters located off the coast of South Australia. The reserve was established in 2007 and is part of the South-east Commonwealth Marine Reserve Network.

The southern right whale uses the inshore area of the reserve to nurse its young.

Protection
Most of the Murray marine reserve area is IUCN protected area category VI, however there are multiple zoned areas within the reserve with different protection classifications.

See also

 Commonwealth marine reserves
 Protected areas of Australia
 Great Australian Bight
 Indian Ocean

Notes

References

External links
 Murray Commonwealth Marine Reserve Network website

South-east Commonwealth Marine Reserves Network
Protected areas established in 2007
Protected areas of Bass Strait